The 1908 VFL Grand Final was an Australian rules football game contested between the Carlton Football Club and Essendon Football Club, held at the Melbourne Cricket Ground in Melbourne on 26 September 1908. It was the 11th annual Grand Final of the Victorian Football League, staged to determine the premiers for the 1908 VFL season. The match, attended by 50,261 spectators, was won by reigning premiers Carlton by a margin of 9 points, marking that club's third premiership victory and third in succession.

Right to challenge
This season was played under the amended Argus system. Carlton was the minor premier, and Essendon had finished second. The teams both qualified for this match by winning their semi-finals matches.

If Essendon had won this match, Carlton would have had the right to challenge Essendon to a rematch for the premiership on the following weekend, because Carlton was the minor premier. The winner of that match would then have won the premiership.

Teams

 Umpire – Jack Elder

Statistics

Goalkickers

Attendance
 MCG crowd – 50,261

See also
 1908 VFL season

References

AFL Tables: 1908 Grand Final
 The Official statistical history of the AFL 2004 
 Ross, J. (ed), 100 Years of Australian Football 1897–1996: The Complete Story of the AFL, All the Big Stories, All the Great Pictures, All the Champions, Every AFL Season Reported, Viking, (Ringwood), 1996. 

VFL/AFL Grand Finals
Grand
Carlton Football Club
Essendon Football Club
September 1908 sports events